A breathing bridge is a handmade structure made from the aerial roots of banyan trees from the region of Amazonas (Peru).
Nukak Makú indigenous tribes have been modelling the roots of these trees from centuries to cross above the streams that spontaneously appear during the wet season.  They first grow the trees along the river banks and after ten years when the roots are big enough they start assembling the bridge. Such a long-term project
cannot be completed in a lifetime, so the knowledge is passed over generations.  Some of these bridges will live for 500 years spanning over 100 feet (30 meters). Sustainable architecture that will live and grow for many generations.  It is one of the few worldwide ecological examples where human benefits themselves coping with nature without provoking any damage to the natural realm.

References

Trestle bridges
Amazonas Region
Indigenous people of South America
Footbridges